The Flores Sea covers  of water in Indonesia. The sea is bounded on the north by the island of Celebes and on the south by Sunda Islands of Flores and Sumbawa.

Geography 

The seas that border the Flores Sea are the Bali Sea (to the west), Java Sea (to the northwest), and the Banda Sea (to the east and northeast).

The Indian Ocean and Savu Sea lie to the south, but are separated from the Flores Sea by various islands.

Islands that border this sea are the Lesser Sunda Islands and Celebes (Sulawesi).

Extent 
The International Hydrographic Organization (IHO) defines the Flores Sea as being one of the waters of the East Indian Archipelago. The IHO defines its limits as follows:
On the North. The South coast of Celebes [Sulawesi] from the West point of Laikang Bay to Tanjong Lassa (120°28'E).

On the East. The Western limit of the Banda Sea between Flores and Celebes [a line from Flores' Northern point to Kalaotoa Island and through the chain of islands lying between it and the South point of Pulo Salayar, through this island and across the Strait to Tanjong Lassa, Celebes].

On the South. The North coasts of Flores, Komodo, Banta and a line to Tanjong Naroe the Northeast point of Soembawa, thence along its North coast to Tanjong Sarokaja.

On the West. A line from Tg Sarokaja to the Western Paternoster island thence to the Northeastern Postiljon Island and to the West point of Laikang Bay, Celebes.

References

External links 
 https://web.archive.org/web/20061013180657/http://www.visibleearth.nasa.gov/view_rec.php?id=6625
 http://www.astrogeodata.it/id219.htm

Seas of Indonesia
Landforms of East Nusa Tenggara
Lesser Sunda Islands
Landforms of Sulawesi
Western Indo-Pacific